Detectives's Wife is an American television sitcom that aired on CBS from July 7 to September 29, 1950. The series aired as the summer replacement for Man Against Crime.

Synopsis
Set in New York City, the sustaining program focused on Adam Conway, a private detective, and his wife Connie, who always got involved in his cases. A review of the July 14, 1950, episode in the trade publication Billboard described the program as "a brightly satirical comedy-mystery series with some of the smartest dialog to hit video yet."

Personnel
Lynn Bari portrayed Connie Conway, and Donald Curtis played Adam Conway. Franklin Schaffner was the producer, and Milton Lewis was the writer.

References

External links

1950s American sitcoms
1950 American television series debuts
1950 American television series endings
CBS original programming
American live television series
Black-and-white American television shows
Television shows set in New York City